Emilio Villa (Milan, 21 September 1914 – Rieti, 14 January 2003) was an Italian poet, visual artist, translator, art critic and Bible scholar. His poems reflected his knowledge of modern and ancient languages, including Italian, French, English, Latin, Greek, Sumerian, and Akkadian.

Emilio Villa is considered the forerunner of the neo-avant-garde, of the Group 63 and of the Novissimi. It is important to remember his commitment to bring out personalities such as Alberto Burri, Mirko Basaldella, Gastone Novelli and, more recently, Claudio Parmiggiani, Mimmo Paladino and Gino De Dominicis.

Life 
Emilio Villa was an artist, poet, biblical scholar, intellectual, founder of magazines and cultural initiatives, promoter of artistic talents and firm supporter of avant-garde values.

Milanese seminarian, he moved to San Paolo (Brazil). There, in addition to founding magazines such as Habitat, he knows the texts of Caillois inherent to natural and primitive writing. Thanks to Noigandres he learns concrete poetry and themes in painting still unknown to the Italian environment.

Most of Villa's writing were printed by small publishing houses throughout Italy, and many are unavailable today. He translated the Babylonian creation epic, Enuma Elis, Homer's Odyssey, and several books of the Hebrew Scriptures, including the first five books of Moses (Pentateuch), Job, Proverbs, and Song of Songs.

In 1950, Villa moved to Brazil, where he became involved with the Brazilian "concrete poets" Haroldo de Campos and Augusto de Campos in São Paulo. He later returned to Rome where he got involved with the local art scene, working with artists such as Alberto Burri, Sante Monachesi, Mario Schifano and later Gino De Dominicis. 

Allergic to the Ytalyana language (withholding of slavery), he tries to make dead languages interact with living ones structured with a deep etymological knowledge. He also works with great international artists such as Mark Rothko, Marcel Duchamp, Matta, and with other Italians such as Mario Schifano, Patrizia Vicinelli, Giulio Turcato and Francesco Lo Savio. 

He publishes Il Frontespizio in Il Meridiano and in Letteratura. You collaborate with Malebolge, Tam Tam, Baobab, Ana Etcetera, Documento-Sud, Linea-Sud, Continuum (see the biographical card compiled on 11/27/2013 by Aldo Tagliaferri (published biographer of E.V.) in "discussion"). 

The largest collection of Emilio Villa's material, curated by Aldo Tagliaferri, is found in the archive of the Museo della Carale Accattino in Ivrea. 

From 6 August to 19 September 2021 in Rome, Appia Antica Archaeological Park, Capo di Bove Complex, the exhibition An Atlas of new art was held. Emilio Villa and the Appia Antica which traces the history, little known but truly fascinating, of the revolutionary art gallery that was based on the Appia Antica between the end of the 1950s and the beginning of the 1960s. With the art gallery, a new, experimental contemporary art magazine was also born, published by Liana Sisti and Mario Ricci, directed by Emilio Villa (1914-2003) and entitled "Appia Antica. Atlas of new art ". 

Villa died in Rieti in 2003.

Poetic statement 
Emilio Villa promoted his texts in semi-clandestine ways (pursuing avant-garde directives, against bargain publishing, for a publishing industry totally free from power games) implementing - without compromise - a conscious dispersion of his texts.

His writing proceeded tirelessly against the mechanistic topicality of supermarket literature and the laziness of a certain type of experimentalism.

References
Renello, Gian Paolo. 2007. Segnare un secolo. Emilio Villa: la parola, l’immagine. Rome, DeriveApprodi.
Campi, Enzo. 2013. Parabol(ich)e dell’ultimo giorno. Per Emilio Villa.  Milan, Dotcom Press.

Notes

External links
http://www.poets.org/poetsorg/poet/emilio-villa

Italian male poets
Italian art critics
Italian artists
Translators of the Bible into Italian
1914 births
2003 deaths
20th-century Italian poets
20th-century Italian translators
20th-century Italian male writers
Italian male non-fiction writers